Boban Stojanović (born 27 February 1979) is a Serbian former professional footballer who played as a striker.

Career
Stojanović came through the youth system of Red Star Belgrade, before being loaned out on several occasions. He enjoyed most success at First League of Serbia and Montenegro sides Radnički Obrenovac and Borac Čačak, scoring in double digits.

In early 2007, Stojanović was transferred to Romanian club UTA Arad. He returned to his homeland and rejoined Borac Čačak in early 2008, helping them secure a spot in UEFA competitions for the first time in history. In the 2008–09 UEFA Cup, Stojanović scored two goals during the qualifying rounds. He also appeared in both legs against Ajax in the first round, as they were eliminated 6–1 on aggregate.

In 2012, Stojanović agreed terms with Canadian Soccer League side London City. He later returned to Serbia and briefly played for his former club Jedinstvo Ub, before rejoining London City in 2013. In 2014, Stojanović made another return to Jedinstvo Ub.

References

External links
 
 
 

Association football forwards
Canadian Soccer League (1998–present) players
Expatriate footballers in Bosnia and Herzegovina
Expatriate footballers in Greece
Expatriate footballers in Romania
Expatriate soccer players in Canada
FC UTA Arad players
First League of Serbia and Montenegro players
FK Borac Čačak players
FK Hajduk Kula players
FK Jedinstvo Ub players
FK Leotar players
FK Radnički Nova Pazova players
FK Srem Jakovo players
FK Voždovac players
FK Železnik players
Liga I players
London City players
Panetolikos F.C. players
Premier League of Bosnia and Herzegovina players
Red Star Belgrade footballers
Serbia and Montenegro expatriate footballers
Serbia and Montenegro expatriate sportspeople in Bosnia and Herzegovina
Serbia and Montenegro footballers
Serbian expatriate footballers
Serbian expatriate sportspeople in Canada
Serbian expatriate sportspeople in Greece
Serbian expatriate sportspeople in Romania
Serbian footballers
Serbian SuperLiga players
Footballers from Belgrade
1979 births
Living people